University Park is a city in Mahaska County, Iowa, United States. The population was 487 at the 2020 census.

Geography

Demographics

2010 census
As of the census of 2010, there were 487 people, 191 households, and 133 families living in the city. The racial makeup of the city was 96.1% White, 1.8% Indian, 1.4% Asian, 0.4% from other races, and 0.2% from two or more races. Hispanic or Latino of any race were 0.8% of the population.

There were 191 households, of which 31.9% had children under the age of 18 living with them, 53.4% were married couples living together, 8.9% had a female householder with no husband present, 7.3% had a male householder with no wife present, and 30.4% were non-families. 19.9% of all households were made up of individuals, and 8.4% had someone living alone who was 65 years of age or older. The average household size was 2.55 and the average family size was 2.97.

The median age in the city was 32.9 years. 25.9% of residents were under the age of 18; 11.2% were between the ages of 18 and 24; 25.7% were from 25 to 44; 24.8% were from 45 to 64; and 12.3% were 65 years of age or older. The gender makeup of the city was 52.2% male and 47.8% female.

2000 census
As of the census of 2000, there were 536 people, 195 households, and 139 families living in the city. The racial makeup of the city was 96.27% White, 0.56% African American, 0.93% Native American, 0.19% Asian, 0.75% from other races, and 1.31% from two or more races. Hispanic or Latino of any race were 1.31% of the population.

There were 195 households, out of which 33.3% had children under the age of 18 living with them, 62.1% were married couples living together, 6.2% had a female householder with no husband present, and 28.7% were non-families. 21.5% of all households were made up of individuals, and 6.7% had someone living alone who was 65 years of age or older. The average household size was 2.55 and the average family size was 2.99.

Population spread: 25.6% under the age of 18, 17.0% from 18 to 24, 28.2% from 25 to 44, 15.5% from 45 to 64, and 13.8% who were 65 years of age or older. The median age was 30 years. For every 100 females, there were 98.5 males. For every 100 females age 18 and over, there were 97.5 males.

The median income for a household in the city was $31,875, and the median income for a family was $35,682. Males had a median income of $30,000 versus $20,938 for females. The per capita income for the city was $14,212. About 7.5% of families and 7.3% of the population were below the poverty line, including 10.3% of those under age 18 and 2.1% of those age 65 or over.

Education
The Oskaloosa Community School District operates local public schools.

References

Cities in Mahaska County, Iowa
Cities in Iowa